Anshan Normal University is a university in the city of Anshan, in Liaoning province. It is under the provincial government. The school was founded in 1958 as a teacher training centre but suspended all operations in 1962 at the dawn of the Chinese Cultural Revolution before it was restarted again in 1978. The campus covers an area of 731,600 square meters. There is a teaching staff of 1207 over various levels from Professor down to post graduate teachers.

External links
 https://web.archive.org/web/20060316040721/http://www.asnc.edu.cn/

Universities and colleges in Liaoning
Anshan
Educational institutions established in 1958
1958 establishments in China